Catamacta scrutatrix is a species of moth of the family Tortricidae. It is found in South Africa.

References

Endemic moths of South Africa
Archipini
Moths described in 1912
Moths of Africa
Taxa named by Edward Meyrick